The English comic double act of Eric Morecambe and Ernie Wise made their first appearance on television in 1951. Following this first appearance, they were to star in four separate television series of their own, as well as making many appearances on other television shows. The following is a list of appearances that the pair made, both together and separately, on television, apart from their four own series.

Background
In the late 1940s, the comedy duo of Morecambe and Wise had begun to make a name for themselves on the variety theatre circuit, and had also made some forays onto BBC Radio. At this time, although still in its infancy in the United Kingdom, television was beginning to assume a greater level of importance in entertainment. Morecambe and Wise's first television audition was at the BBC in 1948, which was when they began a firm resolution that they should appear on television as soon as possible. Their first actual television appearance came in 1951, on a half-hour variety short called Parade of Youth. Following this, they were to make a number of appearances prior to being given the opportunity to do their own television series, Running Wild, in 1954. The failure of Running Wild led to the duo subsequently returning to live variety for a period, until they were invited back to television on The Winifred Atwell Show in 1956.

Full series appearances

The Winifred Atwell Show

Following the failure of Running Wild in 1954, Morecambe and Wise returned to the variety circuit in an effort to restore the fortunes of their act. Having made a successful return to the public eye, after two years they felt ready to make a second attempt at television. Dicky Leeman, a producer with ATV, one of the new independent broadcasters on the ITV network, contacted them with a view to their becoming regulars on a planned new variety show fronted by the pianist Winifred Atwell, with material provided by the writer Johnny Speight. Morecambe and Wise eventually became the resident comedians on the show for the duration of its first series.

Double Six
Morecambe and Wise, having achieved success on The Winifred Atwell Show, felt comfortable enough with television the following year to return to the BBC, where they headlined a new variety show called Double Six.

It's Childsplay
In 1976, at the height of their success at the BBC, Morecambe and Wise fronted a new children's series called It's Childsplay. Unlike previous series, the duo only played a hosting role in this, as it was a showcase for teenage screenwriters to have their work produced for television with casts of respected actors.

Guest appearances

The Ed Sullivan Show

In 1962, with their new television show for ATV, Two of a Kind having completed its second series, Morecambe and Wise were appearing at the London Palladium for a live variety date. In the audience was the American variety host and impresario, Ed Sullivan. Sullivan, a noted fan of British acts, was at the performance to look at the night's host, Bruce Forsyth, but was so impressed with Morecambe and Wise that he offered them the opportunity of three appearances on his variety show on CBS in the United States. Despite lukewarm responses from audiences, Sullivan remained a fan of the duo, and they made a number of appearances on The Ed Sullivan Show between 1963 and 1968. These including appearing on one of the first shows to feature the Beatles, as well as being invited to take part in a special edition to celebrate the 80th birthday of Irving Berlin.

Sunday Night at the London Palladium / The London Palladium Show

In 1955, prior to their joining the cast of The Winifred Atwell Show, Morecambe and Wise made their first appearance on Val Parnell's variety show for ATV, Sunday Night at the London Palladium. Over the next decade, the duo made a total of eleven appearances on the programme, both before and after they had achieved success with their own ATV television series, Two of a Kind.

Other appearances

Morecambe and Wise

Eric Morecambe

Ernie Wise

See also
Running Wild (1954 TV series) § List of episodes (BBC)
List of Two of a Kind episodes (ATV for ITV)
List of The Morecambe & Wise Show (1968 TV series) episodes (BBC)
List of The Morecambe & Wise Show (1978 TV series) episodes (Thames for ITV)

References

Further reading

External links

Morecambe and Wise